"You Gonna Fly" is a song written by Preston Brust, Chris Lucas, and Jaren Johnston, and recorded by Australian country music artist Keith Urban. It was released in October 2011 as fourth and final single from Urban's 2010 album Get Closer. The song reached number one on the U.S. Billboard Hot Country Songs chart in March 2012.

Content
Preston Brust and Chris Lucas of the country duo LoCash wrote the song with Jaren Johnston. According to Brust, a Sony/ATV Music Publishing representative suggested that he and Lucas write with Johnston. Johnston suggested on adding a lyric about a "[b]lackbird on a country street / Hiding from the world with a broken wing", and wrote a song about a man convincing a woman if she "gonna fly with [him]".

Music video
The music video was directed by Brad Belanger and premiered in January 2012.

Critical reception
Billy Dukes of Taste of Country gave the song four stars out of five, saying that it "doesn't do much to separate itself from many of Urban's other uptempo hits" but "puts a big smile on your face from start to finish." Tara Seetharam of Country Universe gave the song a B+, calling his delivery "so three-dimensional that it practically pulls you into the bed of his truck." Liv Carter of Urban Country News gave the song a 'thumbs-up', stating that "the vocal performance, full of delight, infuses the character in the song with so much confidence and joy he becomes irresistible."

Chart performance
"You Gonna Fly" debuted at number 45 on the U.S. Billboard Hot Country Songs chart for the week of November 5, 2011. It debuted at number 91 on the U.S. Billboard Hot 100 chart for the week of December 24, 2011. It debuted at number 89 on the Canadian Hot 100 chart for the week of December 31, 2011. In March 2012 it became Urban's fourteenth number one single on the country charts.

Year-end charts

Certifications

References

2011 singles
2010 songs
Keith Urban songs
Capitol Records Nashville singles
Song recordings produced by Dann Huff
Songs written by Jaren Johnston